Empress Dowager Guo may refer to:

Guo Nüwang (184–235), Cao Pi's wife and empress dowager during the Cao Wei
Empress Guo (Cao Rui's wife) (died 263), consort and empress dowager during the Cao Wei
Empress Dowager Guo (Tang dynasty) (died 848), consort and empress dowager during the Tang dynasty

See also
Empress Guo (disambiguation)

Guo